Van Vorst was a township that existed in Hudson County, New Jersey, United States, from 1841 to 1851, that is now a neighborhood in Jersey City. The township was located on the Hudson River, to the west and north of the original territory of Jersey City and across from Manhattan.

Van Vorst was incorporated as a township by an Act of the New Jersey Legislature on April 12, 1841, from portions of Bergen Township.

As of the 1850 United States Census, the township had a total population of 4,617.

On March 18, 1851, Van Vorst Township was annexed by Jersey City.

See also
Harsimus
Van Vorst Park
Cornelius Van Vorst
Barrow Mansion
Grace Church Van Vorst
Van Vorst House

References

1841 establishments in New Jersey
1851 disestablishments in New Jersey
Former municipalities in Hudson County, New Jersey
Former townships in New Jersey
Populated places disestablished in 1851
Populated places established in 1841
History of Jersey City, New Jersey